Tony Award for Best Lighting Design in a Musical is an award for outstanding Lighting design of a musical. The award was first presented in 2005 after the category of Best Lighting Design was divided into Lighting Design in a Play and Lighting Design in a Musical with each genre receiving its own award.

Winners and nominees

2000s

2010s

2020s

See also
 Tony Award for Best Lighting Design in a Play
 Tony Award for Best Lighting Design
 Drama Desk Award for Outstanding Lighting Design
 Laurence Olivier Award for Best Lighting Design

External links
Tony Awards Official site
Tony Awards at Internet Broadway database Listing
Tony Awards at broadwayworld.com

Tony Awards
Awards established in 2005
2005 establishments in New York City
Lighting